Temple Hotels Inc. is a Canadian real-estate company that owns and manages hotels across Canada. By 2020, the company owned 28 hotels, nine of which were located in Fort McMurray, Alberta, and three in Saskatchewan, formerly including the Temple Gardens Hotel & Spa (its namesake).

Originally established as an income trust under the name Temple Real Estate Investment Trust, the company converted to a corporation under the name Temple Hotels Inc., effective December 31, 2012. Formerly listed on the Toronto Stock Exchange under the symbol TPH, Temple was purchased by Morguard Corporation in February 2020 to become a subsidiary of Morguard.

Properties 
In 2012, Temple REIT owned the following properties:
 Alberta
 Best Western Wayside Inn & Suites — Lloydminster
 Clearwater Suite Hotel — Fort McMurray
 Clearwater Residence Hotel - Timberlea — Fort McMurray
 Franklin Suite Hotel — Fort McMurray
 Holiday Inn Express — Sherwood Park
Hilton Garden Inn - West Edmonton — Edmonton
 Merit Hotel & Suites — Fort McMurray
 Nomad Hotel & Suites — Fort McMurray
 Radisson Hotel & Suites — Fort McMurray
 Sheraton Red Deer — Red Deer
 Vantage Inn and Suites — Fort McMurray
 British Columbia
Inn at the Quay — New Westminster
 Manitoba
 Holiday Inn South — Winnipeg (50%) 
 Northwest Territories 
 Chateau Nova and Chateau Nova Suites — Yellowknife
 Nova Scotia
 Cambridge Suites — Halifax
 Prince George Hotel — Halifax
 Cambridge Suites — Sydney
 Ontario
 Courtyard by Marriott — Ottawa
 Holiday Inn Express Hotel & Suites Ottawa West — Nepean
 Residence Inn by Marriott — London
 Saskatchewan
 Saskatoon Inn & Conference Centre — Saskatoon
 Wingate By Wyndham — Regina

References and footnotes

Companies formerly listed on the Toronto Stock Exchange
Defunct companies based in Winnipeg
Defunct real estate companies
Real estate companies of Canada
Hotel chains in Canada
Defunct hotel chains
Defunct hotels in Canada
Financial services companies based in Manitoba